Čelarevo is a village located in the Bačka Palanka municipality, in the South Bačka District of Serbia. It is situated in the Autonomous Province of Vojvodina. The village has a Serb ethnic majority and its population numbers 5,423 people (2002 census).

Prior to 1946, the village was known as Čib, but was renamed Čelarevo in honour of Partisan commander and National Hero of Yugoslavia Zdravko Čelar (1917-1942).

Demographics
Ethnic groups (2002 census):
 Serbs = 4,396
 Slovaks = 462
 Hungarians = 138
 Yugoslavs = 114
 Croats = 62
 Montenegrins = 22
 Germans = 15
 Ukrainians = 10
 others.

Historical population

1961: 3,717
1971: 4,073
1981: 4,817
1991: 5,011

Gallery

See also

FK Bačka Bačka Palanka
Lav pivo
Carlsberg Srbija
FK ČSK Pivara
List of places in Serbia
List of cities, towns and villages in Vojvodina

References

Slobodan Ćurčić, Broj stanovnika Vojvodine, Novi Sad, 1996.

Bačka Palanka
Places in Bačka
South Bačka District